Brigadier-General Horace Somerville Sewell  (1881–1953) was an officer in the British Army during World War I, notable for his mixed-race ancestry.

Biography
Horace Sewell was born in Wales on 10 February 1881; he was the third son of Henry Sewell, who was in turn the eldest son of the prominent Jamaica planter William Sewell and the mulatto former slave Mary McCrea. Henry Sewell returned to England, where he married and eventually settled at Steephill Castle near Ventnor on the Isle of Wight, but he inherited his father's Jamaica plantation "empire" in 1872, and subsequently divided his time between England and Jamaica, eventually relocating permanently back to the island.

Horace Sewell was educated at Harrow School and Trinity College, Cambridge, before joining the 4th Royal Irish Dragoon Guards in 1900. His regimental nickname was "Sambo", apparently a reference to his Jamaican roots.

Sewell was seconded to the West African Frontier Force for three years from 1907, with a promotion to Captain following soon after the start of the assignment. By the outbreak of World War I in 1914, his regiment was serving in the British Expeditionary Force; he was quickly promoted to major, and took command the regiment as a temporary lieutenant-colonel in March 1915. In April 1918, he was promoted to command the 1st Cavalry Brigade of the British Army, which he led until the end of the Great War. General Sewell was a highly decorated soldier, earning the DSO in 1915, the French Légion d'honneur in 1916, a bar to his DSO for service at the Battle of Cambrai in 1917, and the CMG in 1919, as well as being twice wounded and five times mentioned in dispatches. He also found time in 1916 to marry the daughter of the New York gypsum magnate Jerome Berre King.

After the war he commanded the 7th Queen's Own Hussars until 1923, subsequently the Midland Cavalry Brigade of the Territorial Army until 1928. During World War II, Brigadier-General Sewell was attached to the British Information Service in New York . He matriculated his coat of arms in 1940 and settled at the medieval Tysoe Manor in Warwickshire, but latterly spent much of his time on Jamaica, where he served as a Justice of the Peace.

Brigadier-General Sewell apparently passed for white, and evidence of his mixed-race heritage surprised modern researchers, but his nickname suggests that his ancestry was known to his comrades and subordinates, and he was recognized as "black" by Americans who he came in contact with during his World War II posting.

References

British Army cavalry generals of World War I
People educated at Harrow School
Alumni of Trinity College, Cambridge
4th Royal Irish Dragoon Guards officers
1881 births
1953 deaths
Royal West African Frontier Force officers
Companions of the Order of St Michael and St George
Companions of the Distinguished Service Order
Recipients of the Legion of Honour
Black British soldiers
English people of Jamaican descent
British Army generals
Welsh military personnel
Jamaican justices of the peace